John Jeffrey Leal (born December 13, 1954) is a Canadian politician who serves as the 63rd and current mayor of Peterborough. Previously, he was a member of the Legislative Assembly of Ontario from 2003 to 2018 who represented the riding of Peterborough. He served in the cabinet of Kathleen Wynne. On October 24, 2022 he was elected mayor of Peterborough.

Background
John Jeffrey Leal was born and raised in Peterborough. He attended Kenner Collegiate and has an Bachelor of Arts (Honours) degree in Economics and Political Science from Trent University (1978) and a degree in Business Administration from the University of Windsor (1981). Leal worked as executive assistant to members of Provincial Parliament (MPPs) John Eakins and Larry South in the 1980s. He was a health and safety representative for Coyle Corrugated Containers. He is married to Karan, a teacher and school principal, with two children, Braden and Shanae.

Politics

Municipal
He served on the Peterborough City Council from 1985 to 2003, representing the Otonabee Ward. At City Hall he was appointed as Deputy Mayor (1993-2003) and chaired the social services committee after the 2000 municipal election. In July 2022, Leal announced his candidacy for mayor of Peterborough, which he would later win.

Provincial
Leal ran for provincial office in the 1999 provincial election as the Liberal candidate. He was narrowly defeated by Progressive Conservative incumbent Gary Stewart. He defeated Stewart by over six thousand votes in a 2003 rematch, amid a provincial shift to the Liberal Party. Leal was re-elected in 2007, 2011 and 2014.

During his time in government, he has served as Parliamentary Assistant to several ministers including Ministry of Training, Colleges and Universities (2004), Ministry of Economic Development and Trade (2005), Ministry of Energy (2005), Ministry of the Environment (2006), and the Ministry of Aboriginal Affairs (2007–09). In February 2010, he was named the Chief Government Whip.

In February 2013, Premier Kathleen Wynne named Leal to Ontario's Cabinet, serving in the role as Minister of Rural Affairs.

Leal has helped secure over $400 million in funding for Peterborough, creating and preserving over 3,700 jobs with investments in infrastructure, transportation, businesses and health care. This included the creation of a new hospital, Peterborough Regional Health Centre, and funding following a damaging flood in 2004.

Leal has championed a number of issues through private member's bills, including retirement and income security measures. He introduced a private member's bill in 2008 to provide creditor protection for Registered Retirement Savings Plans (RRSPs). Two years later, he introduced a separate bill that would require companies with twenty or more employees to offer a savings or pension plan that all employees would automatically join (with the ability to opt out). The stated purpose of this bill, which was supported by the Canadian Life and Health Insurance Association, was to reduce the costs of such insurance plans compared with retail mutual funds.

In June 2014, Leal was appointed as the Minister of Agriculture and Food and Rural Affairs.

Cabinet positions

Electoral record

References

External links
 

1954 births
21st-century Canadian politicians
Living people
Members of the Executive Council of Ontario
Ontario Liberal Party MPPs
Mayors of Peterborough, Ontario
Trent University alumni
University of Windsor alumni